Gokdalsan is a mountain in the county of Gapyeong County in Gyeonggi-do, South Korea.

See also
 List of mountains in Korea

Notes

References
 

Mountains of South Korea
Mountains of Gyeonggi Province

zh:鹄达山